Me and Charly is a 1978 Danish drama film directed by Morten Arnfred and Henning Kristiansen. The film was selected as the Danish entry for the Best Foreign Language Film at the 51st Academy Awards, but was not accepted as a nominee.

Cast
 Kim Jensen as Steffen
 Allan Olsen as Charly
 Helle Nielsen as Majbritt
 Ghita Nørby as Helle
 Finn Nielsen as Jørgen
 Jens Okking as Auto-Gunnar
 Lise Henningsen as Majbritt's mother
 Else Højgaard as Majbritts grandmother
 Erno Müller as Headmaster at a youth home

See also
 List of submissions to the 51st Academy Awards for Best Foreign Language Film
 List of Danish submissions for the Academy Award for Best Foreign Language Film

References

External links
 

1978 films
Danish drama films
1970s Danish-language films
1978 drama films
Films directed by Morten Arnfred
Best Danish Film Bodil Award winners